Gregory Daniel Davies (born 14 May 1968) is a Welsh comedian, actor, presenter, and writer. He is best known for his roles as Greg in We Are Klang, Mr Gilbert in The Inbetweeners, Ken Thompson in Cuckoo, the Taskmaster in Taskmaster, Dan Davies in Man Down, and Paul Wickstead in The Cleaner, the latter of which he also wrote. He has appeared on Mock the Week, Fast and Loose, Live at the Apollo, and Would I Lie to You?

For his performance in Cuckoo, Davies was nominated for the BAFTA Television Award for Best Male Comedy Performance in 2013.

Early life
Gregory Daniel Davies was born in St Asaph, Denbighshire, Wales,  on 14 May 1968. His Welsh parents lived in England at the time, but his father drove his mother across the border to make sure he was born in Wales so that he would be eligible to play rugby for the Wales national team. He grew up in Wem, which he regards as his home. His father's origins lie in Porthmadog. Like many people in North Wales, he also claims descent from Owain the Great.

Davies was educated at Thomas Adams School in Wem, before studying English and Drama at Brunel University in London. Prior to embarking on a career in comedy, he taught Drama for 13 years at a number of secondary schools: Langleywood School in Slough, Orleans Park School in Twickenham, and Sandhurst School in Sandhurst.

Career
In 2003, Davies made an appearance on the children's TV show Dick & Dom in da Bungalow, playing a caricatured version of himself named "Massive Greg".

In 2005, Davies played a caricature of cricketer W. G. Grace in a series of adverts for Channel 4's television coverage of The Ashes.

In 2007, Davies was nominated three times in the Chortle Awards, in the categories "Breakthrough Act" (for his solo stand-up act), "Best Sketch, Variety or Character Act", and "Best Full-Length Show" (both as part of sketch team We Are Klang).

From 2008, Davies played head of Sixth Form Mr Gilbert in the E4 coming-of-age British comedy The Inbetweeners. He also appears in the follow-up films The Inbetweeners Movie (2011) and The Inbetweeners 2 (2014).

In 2010, Davies' first solo stand-up show Firing Cheeseballs at a Dog was nominated for the Fosters Edinburgh Comedy Awards at the Edinburgh Festival. The show was subsequently taken on his first ever tour the following autumn. He was also nominated for the Edinburgh Fringe's Malcolm Hardee "Act Most Likely to Make a Million Quid" Award.

From October 2013, Davies starred in Channel 4's sitcom Man Down, as Dan, a man who hates his job as a teacher, with Rik Mayall as his father. Channel 4 commissioned an additional 25-minute Christmas special before the first series aired, and a second series was announced during Davies's live tour "The Back of My Mum's Head". Following Mayall's death in June 2014, Davies met with Channel 4 to discuss the future of the show.  Mayall had been intended to have a more prominent role in the second series.  Channel 4 later announced that Man Down would return for a second series in 2015. The classroom used in the show is the same classroom in which Davies taught at Sandhurst School.

Since July 2015, Davies has been the host of the panel game show Taskmaster. In December 2015, he starred in BBC Two's comedy drama A Gert Lush Christmas where he played Tony, the uncle of Russell and Kerry Howard's characters. On Christmas Day he played King Hydroflax in the 2015 Doctor Who Special "The Husbands of River Song".

In November 2017, Davies recorded a Netflix stand-up comedy special at the Hammersmith Apollo during his Magnificent Beast UK tour. It was released as You Magnificent Beast in 2018.

In 2021, Davies wrote and starred in the BBC One comedy series The Cleaner.
He is also the current host of Never Mind the Buzzcocks on Sky Max which was revived in 2021.

Personal life
He lives in the Kennington area of London. He was in a relationship with Labour Party politician Liz Kendall from 2007 to 2015.

Comedy specials

Filmography

References

External links

1968 births
Living people
21st-century English male actors
Actors from Shropshire
Alumni of Brunel University London
British male film actors
British male television actors
British male voice actors
British people of Welsh descent
British stand-up comedians
Comedians from Shropshire
Edinburgh Festival performers
People educated at Thomas Adams School
People from St Asaph
People from Wem
21st-century British comedians
Taskmaster (TV series)